Farida Fates (née Zigha; born 2 February 1962 in Jijel, Algeria) is a former French athlete, who specialized in long-distance running.

She won four track titles at the French Athletics Championships: over 1500 metres (1990), 3000 metres (1989 and 1994) and 5000 metres (1996). She also won three titles at the French Cross Country Championships (1990, 1996 and 1997).

On 21 August 1994, in Cologne, she improved the French 5000 m record by completing the distance in 15:16.41 minutes.

She won the bronze medal team at 1993 IAAF World Cross Country Championships and the team silver medal at the 1994 European Cross Country Championships.

International competitions

National titles
French Championships in Athletics 
1500 m: 1990
3000 m: 1989, 1994
5000 m: 1996   
French Cross Country Championships
Long course: 1990, 1996, 1997

Personal bests

References

External links

Farida Fatès at Track and Field Statistics

1962 births
Living people
People from Jijel
Algerian emigrants to France
French female middle-distance runners
French female long-distance runners
Olympic athletes of France
Athletes (track and field) at the 1996 Summer Olympics
World Athletics Championships athletes for France
Athletes (track and field) at the 1993 Mediterranean Games
Mediterranean Games bronze medalists for France
Mediterranean Games medalists in athletics
French Athletics Championships winners
French tennis coaches